The 2008 Pro Tour season was the thirteenth season of the Magic: The Gathering Pro Tour. It began on 15 December 2007, with Grand Prix Stuttgart, and ended on 14 December 2008, with the 2008 World Championship in Memphis. The season consisted of twenty-one Grand Prixs, and four Pro Tours, located in Kuala Lumpur, Hollywood, Berlin, and Memphis. The Grand Prixs from June until August were designated Summer Series Grand Prixs, awarding more prizes and additional Pro Points. At the end of the season, Shuhei Nakamura became the fourth consecutive Japanese player to win Pro Player of the year. Dirk Baberowski, Michael Turian, Jelger Wiegersma, Olivier Ruel, and Ben Rubin were inducted into the Hall of Fame.

Grand Prix – Stuttgart
GP Stuttgart (15–16 December 2007)
Format: Limited
Attendance: 1336
 Shuhei Nakamura
 Robert van Medevoort
 Jonathan Bergström
 Raul Porojan
 Joel Calafell
 Fried Meulders
 Patrizio Golia
 Marc Vogt

Pro Tour – Kuala Lumpur (15–17 February 2008)
Jon Finkel of the US won Kuala Lumpur, becoming the first Hall of Fame member to do so after his induction. The top eight is considered to be one of the best ever, with the players having a total of six Pro Tour wins between them prior to Kuala Lumpur.

Tournament data 
Prize pool: $230,795
Players: 346
Format: Booster Draft (Lorwyn-Morningtide)
Head Judge: Toby Elliott

Top 8

Final standings

Grand Prixs – Vancouver, Shizuoka, Vienna, Philadelphia, Brussels

GP Vancouver (23–24 February)
Format: Extended
Attendance: 395
 Paul Cheon
 Ben Lundquist
 Marc Bonnefoy
 Zack Hall
 Jason Fleurant
 Michael Guerney
 Aaron Paquette
 Hunter Coale

GP Philadelphia (15–16 March)
Format: Extended
Attendance: 969
 Gerard Fabiano
 Adam Yurchick
 Luis Scott-Vargas
 Tyler Mantey
 Paul Mathews
 Ben Wienburg
 Matt Hansen
 Jonathan Sonne

GP Shizuoka (8–9 March)
Format: Standard
Attendance: 827
 Yuuta Takahashi
 Olivier Ruel
 Kenji Tsumura
 Ryousuke Masuno
 Kazuya Mitamura
 Shintarou Ishimura
 Taichi Fujimoto
 Akira Asahara

GP Brussels (3–4 May)
Format: Limited
Attendance: 1430
 Kamiel Cornelissen
 Gabriel Nassif
 Raphaël Lévy
 Antoine Ruel
 Gaetan Lefebvre
 Rogier Kleij
 Holger Lange
 Alexandre Peset

GP Vienna (15–16 March)
Format: Extended
Attendance: 1154
 Mateusz Kopec
 Nikolaus Eigner
 Matija Vlahovic
 Tomoharu Saitou
 Gianluca Bevere
 Horst Winkelmann 
 Wojciech Zuber 
 Andras Nagy

Pro Tour Hollywood (23–25 May 2008)
Charles Gindy became the second American to win a Pro Tour in the 2008 season. Playing a green-black elf/rock deck, he defeated Germany's Jan Ruess, playing merfolk, in the finals.

Tournament data 
Prize pool: $230,795
Players: 371
Format: Standard
Head Judge: Sheldon Menery

Top 8

Final standings

Grand Prixs – Birmingham, Indianapolis, Buenos Aires, Madrid, Kobe, Denver, Copenhagen, Manila, Rimini, Kansas City, Paris

GP Birmingham (30 May – 1 June)
Format: Block Constructed
Attendance: 581
 Lee Shi Tian
 Remi Fortier
 Raphaël Lévy
 Jelger Wiegersma
 Antti Malin
 Matthias Künzler
 Manuel Bucher
 Jonathan Randle

GP Summer Series Indianapolis (21–22 June)
Format: Limited
Attendance: 1124
 Jelger Wiegersma
 Gaudenis Vidugiris
 Jamie Parke
 Tyler Mantey
 James Beltz
 Eric Franklin
 Randy Wright
 Ben Rasmussen

GP Summer Series Buenos Aires (28–29 June)
Format: Standard
Attendance: 580
 Francisco Braga
 Felipe Alves Pellegrini
 Adrien Degaspare
 Damian Buckley
 Ivan Taroshi Fox
 Olivier Ruel
 Nicolas Bevacqua 
 Sebastian Pozzo

GP Summer Series Madrid (26–27 July)
Format: Limited
Attendance: 1465
 Lasse Nørgaard
 Daniel Martin Bermejo
 Manuel Bucher
 Romain Fenaux-briot
 Allan Christensen
 Sergio Salas Martinez
 Tommi Lindgren
 Geir Bakke

GP Summer Series Kobe (2–3 August)
Format: Block Constructed
Attendance: 811
 Yuuta Takahashi
 Takayuki Takagi 
 Masaya Tanahashi 
 Shou Yoshimori
 Hirosi Yosida 
 Katsuya Ueda
 Koutarou Ootsuka 
 Tsuyoshi Ikeda

GP Summer Series Denver (9–10 August)
Format: Block Constructed
Attendance: 625
 Gerry Thompson
 Lee Steht 
 Nathan Elkins
 Kenneth Castor
 A.J. Sacher
 Kyle Bundgaard
 Antonino De Rosa
 Hunter Burton

GP Summer Series Copenhagen (23–24 August)
Format: Standard
Attendance: 610
 David Larsson
 Tomoharu Saitou
 Jakub Jahoda
 Shuhei Nakamura
 Guillaume Wafo-Tapa
 William Cavaglieri
 Philipp Summereder
 Robert Van Meedevort

GP Summer Series Manila (30–31 August)
Format: Block Constructed
Attendance: 641
 Hironobu Sugaya
 Shouta Yasooka
 Luis Magisa
 Shingou Kurihara
 Masami Kaneko
 Koutarou Ootsuka 
 Raphaël Lévy
 Wai Keat Ken Lim 

GP Rimini (13–14 September)
Format: Block Constructed
Attendance: 686
 Emanuele Giusti
 Shuhei Nakamura
 Claudio Salemi
 Marcello Calvetto
 Matthias Künzler
 Rodrigo Renedo
 Joel Calafell
 Petr Nahodil

GP Paris (18–19 October)
Format: Limited
Attendance: 1838
 Arjan van Leeuwen
 Pierre Rensonnet
 Menno Dolstra
 Simon Görtzen
 Niels Noorlander
 Romain Lisciandro
 Artur Cnotalski
 Jan De Coster

GP Kansas City (18–19 October)
Format: Limited
Attendance: 746
 Tim Landale
 Carlos Romão
 Jonathan Sonne
 Sammy Batarseh
 Brandon Scheel
 Justin Meyer
 Chris Pait
 Willy Edel

Pro Tour Berlin (31 October – 2 November 2008)
Luis Scott-Vargas of the US, defeated Matej Zatlkaj in the finals of Pro Tour Berlin. Six of the eight quarter finalists, including all four semi-finalists, played variants on the Elf-Ball combo deck.

Tournament data 
Prize pool: $230,795
Players: 454
Format: Extended
Head Judge: Sheldon Menery

Top 8

Final standings

Grand Prixs – Atlanta, Okoyama, Taipei, Auckland

GP Atlanta (15–16 November)
Format: Limited
Attendance: 684
 Luis Scott-Vargas
 Gerry Thompson
 Chris Fennell
 Steven Wolansky
 Brett Piazza
 Tomoharu Saitou
 Chris Pait
 Ken Adams

GP Taipei (29–30 November)
Format: Limited
Attendance: 270
 Shu Komuro
 Yoshitaka Nakano
 Osamu Fujita
 Homg Gi Tsai
 Tun Min Huang
 Sheng Xiu Jian
 Lee Shi Tian
 Kang Nien Chiang

GP Okoyama (22–23 November)
Format: Limited
Attendance: 635
 Makihito Mihara
 Kazuya Mitamura
 Chikara Nakajima
 Tsuyoshi Ikeda
 Daisuke Muramatsu
 Olivier Ruel
 Akimasa Yamamoto
 Guillaume Wafo-Tapa

GP Auckland (6–7 December)
Format: Limited
Attendance: 254
 Dominic Lo
 Nick Tung
 Justin Cheung
 Jason Chung
 Olivier Ruel
 Joseph Combs
 Basam Tabet
 Chris Hay

2008 World Championships – Memphis (11–14 December 2008) 

The World Championships began with the induction of Dirk Baberowski, Michael Turian, Jelger Wiegersma, Olivier Ruel, and Ben Rubin, into the Hall of Fame. In the individual competition, Antti Malin of Finland emerged as the World Champion from a top eight including only one player without a prior Sunday appearance. In the team competition, it was the first time that the top four teams would play on Sunday, as opposed to only the top two. The US team defeated Australia in the finals.

Tournament data 

Prize pool: $245,245 (individual) + $192,425 (national teams)
Players: 329
Formats: Standard, Booster Draft (Shards of Alara), Extended
Head Judge: Toby Elliott

Top 8

Final standings

National team competition 

  United States (Michael Jacob, Paul Cheon, Sam Black)
  Australia (Aaron Nicastri, Brandon Lau, Justin Cheung)
  Brazil (Willy Edel, Vagner Casatti, Luiz Guilherme de Michielli)
  Japan (Masashi Oiso, Yuuya Watanabe, Akihiro Takakuwa)

Pro Player of the year final standings 

After the World Championship, Shuhei Nakamura was awarded the Pro Player of the year title, making Japan the first country to win the title in four consecutive years.

Performance by country 

Japan had the most Top 8 appearances at 6 although they had less than half as many players on the Pro Tour in the season than the United States, which had the secondmost Top 8 appearances at 5.

T8 = Number of players from that country appearing in a Pro Tour Top 8; Q = Number of players from that country participating in Pro Tours; M = Median finish over all PTs; GT = Gravy Trainers (aka players with a Pro Players Club level of 4 or more) from that country created in the 2009 season; Best Player (PPts) = Player with the most Pro Points from that country, Pro Points of that player in brackets.

References 

Magic: The Gathering professional events